Ahmadabad (also Romanized as Aḩmadābād; also known as, Aḩmadābād Shāh Velāyat, Shāh Valad, and Shāh Valāyat) is a village in Sardshir Rural District, in the Central District of Buin va Miandasht County, Isfahan Province, Iran. At the 2006 census, its population was 66, in 19 families.

References 

Populated places in Buin va Miandasht County